"Mambo" is a song by Dominican singer Henry Santos featuring Dominican salsa singer David Kada. It was released as a single on July 16, 2021, and served as the ninth single from Santos's fifth studio album Friends & Legends (2021). The music video was released the day before.

Charts

References

2021 songs
2021 singles
Henry Santos songs